John Mair may refer to:

John Major (philosopher) (1467–1550), Scottish philosopher
John Mair (journalist), British journalist and academic
John Mair (architect) (1876–1959), New Zealand government architect (1923–1941)
John Mair (athlete) (born 1963), Jamaican sprinter

See also
John Maire (1703–1771), English Roman Catholic conveyancer
John Major (disambiguation)
John Mayer (disambiguation)
John Meier (disambiguation)